Tam Zamanı Şimdi (Now is the Perfect Time) is the second studio album by Turkish ska punk rock group Athena, released on April, 2000.

In 2001, the band composed the song Oniki dev adam for supporting the Turkey national basketball team in the EuroBasket 2001.

On 18 August 2005, the song "Tam Zamanı Şimdi" was included in the FIFA 06 videogame.

Track listing 
Lyrics for all songs are in the Turkish language.

Compact disc version 
 Her Şey Güzel Olacak 
 Yaşamak Var Ya 
 Aşk Meşk Yok
 Macera
 Sonrası Yoktu
 Tam Zamanı Şimdi (Now is the perfect time)
 İki Lafa Düştün Ortaya
 Palavra 
 Rüya
 Dön Baba Dönelim 
 Aşk Meşk Yok (alternative version)
 Oniki Dev Adam (Twelve giant men)

References 

2000 albums